Festen er ikke over... det er kake igjen is a compilation from the Norwegian rock band deLillos. It includes six previously unreleased tracks.

Track listing
Disc one:
"Velkommen"
"Ut"
"Stakkars Oslo"
"Klasse 1 comfort"
"Smak av honning"
"Nitten åttifire"
"Paris"
"Stum"
"Uten deg"
"Smilet til Cecilie"
"Grunn nok til å lykkelig dø"
"Kjærlighet"
"Ikke gå"
"Nå lever den av seg selv"
"Svigermor"
"En stefar"
"Fullstendig oppslukt av frykt"
"Brød"
"Du og jeg og livet"
"Full men pen"

Disc two:
"Neste sommer"
"Glemte minner"
"Frognerbadet"
"Den feite mannen"
"Min beibi dro avsted"
"Sveve over byen"
"S'il vous plait"
"Kokken Tor"
"Finnes det en kvinne"
"Klokken er mye nå"
"Suser avgårde alle mann"
"Nei ikke gjør det"
"Vår"
"Forelsket"
"Balladen om Kåre og Nelly"
"Tøff i pysjamas"
"Hjernen er alene"
"Søster"
"Johnny Fredrik"
"Kast alle papirene"

Bonus tracks:
"1000 smil"
"Elsk meg i morgen"
"Det var Stones"
"Fri flyt"
"Stjerne"
"Varme tanker om sne og is"
"Shopping og sex"
"Hankø-trotten"
"Blir det noen fest"
"Et øyeblikk"
"Se på meg"
"Hjernen er alene"

2005 compilation albums
DeLillos albums
Sonet Records albums